Lake Grove is a village in the Town of Brookhaven in Suffolk County, New York, United States. The population was 11,163 at the 2010 census.

History
The area of Lake Grove was settled in the early 18th century along Middle Country Road, which was then part of the Old Kings Highway, originally a Native American footpath. The community's first church building, built in 1818, was the First Congregational Church of New Village. Placed on the National Register of Historic Places in 2002, the building has been preserved and is depicted on the village seal. In 1870, Lake Grove established its first post office, which carried the mail to and from Lakeland station (discontinued in 1883) by horse and wagon. The area was variously called Lakeland, Lakeville, New Village, Ronkonkoma or West Middle Island until it settled on the name Lake Grove in mid-19th century, after the groves of trees near Lake Ronkonkoma.

During the early 20th century Lake Ronkonkoma became a popular area for recreation, which prompted many small summer houses built on private roads of Lake Grove. In 1921, a new post office was erected in the eastern part of the area and given the name of Centereach. The next significant housing development built in Lake Grove was called Brook Lawn and was located on Stony Brook Road, which later grew into Stony Brook. More developments followed and the population of Lake Grove increased rapidly. In 1954, the newly built Nesconset Highway created a major commercial crossroad in Lake Grove, which prompted the construction of the Smith Haven Mall in 1968, which in turn made the local residents become concerned about the impact of new businesses and increased traffic in their community. 

In order to gain local control of the zoning and planning, Lake Grove was incorporated by a vote of 552 to 332 on September 9, 1968.

Geography 

Demographics

As of the census of 2000, there were 10,250 people, 3,419 households, and 2,742 families residing in the village. The population density was 3,436.8 people per square mile (1,328.0/km2). There were 3,509 housing units at an average density of 1,176.6 per square mile (454.6/km2). The racial makeup of the village was 91.31% White, 1.44% African American, 0.09% Native American, 4.93% Asian, 1.00% from other races, and 1.24% from two or more races. Hispanic or Latino of any race were 4.84% of the population.

There were 3,419 households, out of which 38.7% had children under the age of 18 living with them, 66.8% were married couples living together, 9.5% had a female householder with no husband present, and 19.8% were non-families. 14.4% of all households were made up of individuals, and 4.9% had someone living alone who was 65 years of age or older. The average household size was 2.98 and the average family size was 3.31.

In the village, the population was spread out, with 26.3% under the age of 18, 7.3% from 18 to 24, 34.7% from 25 to 44, 22.7% from 45 to 64, and 9.0% who were 65 years of age or older. The median age was 35 years. For every 100 females there were 98.1 males. For every 100 females age 18 and over, there were 94.3 males.

The median income for a household in the village was $67,174, and the median income for a family was $73,065. Males had a median income of $53,113 versus $33,253 for females. The per capita income for the village was $26,321. About 2.5% of families and 5.1% of the population were below the poverty threshold, including 6.8% of those under age 18 and 3.2% of those age 65 or over.

Government 
As of December 2021, the Mayor of Lake Grove is Robert J. Scottaline, the Deputy Mayor is Richard J. Cohen, and the Village Trustees are Richard J. Cohen, Richard Kick, John G. Peterson, and Felix Wienclaw.

Education
Lake Grove is served by three school districts: the Sachem Central School District in the southern section, the Middle Country Central School District in the middle and northern sections, and the Three Village Central School District in the northeastern section.

Economy 
Lake Grove is home to roughly half of the Smith Haven Mall's property.

Notable people 

Jon Bellion – Singer-songwriter, record producer, rapper.
Arthur H. Howell (May 3, 1872 – July 10, 1940) – Chairman of the American Society of Mammalogists, teacher of Luther Goldman.
Alycia Lane – Television journalist.
Joseph Michael Scally (born December 31, 2002) – American professional soccer player who plays as a right back for Bundesliga club Borussia Mönchengladbach.

References

External links

 Official website

Brookhaven, New York
Villages in New York (state)
Villages in Suffolk County, New York